Ferenc Marič ( Prekmurje dialect: Ferenc Marič) (June 11, 1791 – after 1844) was a Hungarian teacher and poet.

He was born in Istvánfalva (Apátistvánfalva). His father György Marits was the first teacher and cantor in the village. György was born in Gerecsavecz (Gerečavci, between Sveti Jurij and Večeslavci). Ferenc's mother Anna Trájber was of German descent from Ritkarócz (Ritkaháza, Kétvölgy).

Ferenc followed in his father's footsteps and became a teacher. He began his career in 1809 as an assistant teacher in Felsőszölnök, under schoolmaster Mihály Bertalanits (who was born in the same village as Marič's father). He found the Ruzsics Hymnal, a Slovene hymnal edited by a teacher named Ruzsics (first name unknown) around 1789. Both Bertalanits and Marič copied the hymnal and distributed it among the population of their villages: Marič in Istvánfalva and Bertalanits in Pečarovci. It is possible that they also rewrote parts of the book or added to it.

Marič married Terézia Ficzkó in Felsőszölnök. Later they moved to Istvánfalva, where he took over a teaching job that belonged to his father, who had died five years earlier. He taught here until 1842, when he retired. He moved to the village of Čepinci, which belonged to the parish of Felsőszölnök. He was last mentioned in 1844, when his daughter Anna died; the date of his death is unknown.

See also 
 List of Slovene writers and poets in Hungary

References 
 Vis. Can. Istvánfalva, 1829, June 25
 Francek Mukič & Marija Kozar: Slovensko Porabje, Mohorjeva družba Celje, 1982.
 Vilko Novak: Martjanska pesmarica, Založba ZRC. 1997. 

Slovenian writers and poets in Hungary
Slovenian educators
Slovenian poets
Slovenian male poets
1791 births
19th-century deaths
19th-century poets